Chilostoma intermedium is a species of medium-sized, air-breathing, land snail, a terrestrial pulmonate gastropod mollusk in the family Helicidae, the true snails. The species is endemic to Austria, and is classed as of Least-concern.

References

External links 

Chilostoma
Gastropods described in 1832